Bar Italia is an Italian café located on Frith Street in the Soho district of London.

Location and notable events

On 26 January 1926, John Logie Baird gave the first public demonstration of television at 22 Frith Street, the building where Bar Italia is located. The blue plaque above the front door commemorates this event.
 
Bar Italia in its present form was opened as a café in 1949 by the Polledri family, and is still owned by Veronica and Anthony Polledri today.

In popular culture
Bar Italia inspired the song of the same name by the band Pulp, which is the last track of their 1995 album Different Class. The song describes the cafe as "round the corner in Soho" and "where other broken people go."

In November 2010, it was announced that Dave Stewart and Ian La Frenais were writing a stage musical about the cafe which will be called Bar Italia. Stewart was quoted as saying, "This coffee shop is very small but what goes on in there is as big as the world."

In July 2011, British artist Ed Gray unveiled a painting of Bar Italia featuring patrons Rupert Everett and John Hurt. It now hangs in the cafe's window.

In 2016 Carl Randall painted the portrait of Movie Producer Jeremy Thomas standing in front of Bar Italia, as part of the artist's 'London Portraits' series, where he asked various cultural figures to choose a place in London for the backdrop of their portraits. In an interview Thomas explained he chose Bar Italia for this portrait "because I like being there, I go there regularly, I feel comfortable there....theres a bohemianism in this place and its full of memories of mine since I was a lad". A print of the painting is hanging on the cafes wall.

Awards 
Bar Italia was awarded the 2010 London Lifestyle Award for London Coffee Shop of the Year.

References

Coffeehouses and cafés in London
Restaurants in London
Restaurants established in 1949
Soho, London